ICQ New is a cross-platform instant messaging (IM) and VoIP client. The name ICQ derives from the English phrase "I Seek You". Originally developed by the Israeli company Mirabilis in 1996, the client was bought by AOL in 1998, and then by Mail.Ru Group (now VK) in 2010.

The ICQ client application and service were initially released in November 1996, freely available to download. ICQ was among the first stand-alone instant messenger (IM) applications—while real-time chat was not in itself new (Internet Relay Chat (IRC) being the most common platform at the time), the concept of a fully centralized service with individual user accounts focused on one-on-one conversations set the blueprint for later instant messaging services like AIM, and its influence is seen in modern social media applications. ICQ became the first widely adopted IM platform.

At its peak around 2001, ICQ had more than 100 million accounts registered. At the time of the Mail.Ru acquisition in 2010, there were around 42 million daily users. In 2020, the Mail.Ru Group, which owns ICQ, decided to launch new software, "ICQ New", based on its messenger. The updated messenger was presented to the general public on April 6, 2020. In 2022, ICQ had about 11 million monthly users.

During the second week of January 2021, ICQ saw a renewed increase in popularity in Hong Kong, spurred on by the controversy over WhatsApp's privacy policy update. The number of downloads for the application increased 35-fold in the region.

Features
Private chats are a conversation between two users. When logging into an account, the chat can be accessed from any device thanks to cloud synchronization. A user can delete a sent message at any time either in their own chat or in their conversation partner's, and a notification will be received instead indicating that the message has been deleted.

Any important messages from group or private chats, as well as an unlimited number and size of media content, can be sent to the conversation with oneself. Essentially, this chat acts as a free cloud storage.

These are special chats where chats can take place of up to 25 thousand participants at the same time. Any user can create a group. A user can hide their phone number from other participants; there is an advanced polling feature; there is the possibility to see which group members have read a message, and notifications can be switched off for messages from specific group members.

An alternative to blogs. Channel authors can publish posts as text messages and also attach media files. Once the post is published, subscribers receive a notification as they would from regular and group chats. The channel author can remain anonymous and does not have to show any information in the channel description. 
 
A special API-bot is available and can be used by anyone to create a bot, i.e. a small program which performs specific actions and interacts with the user. Bots can be used in a variety of ways ranging from entertainment to business services.

Stickers (small images or photos expressing some form of emotion) are available to make communication via the application more emotive and personalized. Users can use the sticker library already available or upload their own. In addition, thanks to machine learning the software will recommend a sticker during communication by itself.

Masks are images that are superimposed onto the camera in real-time. They can be used during video calls, superimposed onto photos and sent to other users. 
 
A nickname is a name made up by a user. It can replace a phone number when searching for and adding user contact. By using a nickname, users can share their contact details without providing a phone number. 
 
Smart answers are short phrases that appear above the message box which can be used to answer messages. ICQ New analyzes the contents of a conversation and suggests a few pre-set answers.

ICQ New makes it possible to send audio messages. However, for people who do not want to or cannot listen to the audio, the audio can be automatically transcribed into text. All the user needs to do is click the relevant button and they will see the message in text form. 
 
Aside from text messaging, users can call each other as well as arrange audio or video calls for up to five people. During the video call, AR-masks can be used.

UIN
ICQ users are identified and distinguished from one another by UIN, or User Identification Numbers, distributed in sequential order. The UIN was invented by Mirabilis, as the user name assigned to each user upon registration. Issued UINs started at '10,000' (5 digits) and every user receives a UIN when first registering with ICQ. As of ICQ6 users are also able to log in using the specific e-mail address they associated with their UIN during the initial registration process.
Unlike other instant messaging software or web applications, on ICQ the only permanent user info is the UIN, although it is possible to search for other users using their associated e-mail address or any other detail they have made public by updating it in their account's public profile. In addition the user can change all of his or her personal information, including screen name and e-mail address, without having to re-register. Since 2000 ICQ and AIM users were able to add each other to their contact list without the need for any external clients. (The AIM service has since been discontinued.) As a response to UIN theft or sale of attractive UINs, ICQ started to store email addresses previously associated with a UIN. As such UINs that are stolen can sometimes be reclaimed. This applies only if (since 1999 onwards) a valid primary email address was entered into the user profile.

History

The founding company of ICQ, Mirabilis, was established in June 1996 by five Israeli developers: Yair Goldfinger, Sefi Vigiser, Amnon Amir, Arik Vardi, and Arik's father Yossi Vardi. ICQ was one of the first text-based messengers to reach a wide range of users.

The technology Mirabilis developed for ICQ was distributed free of charge. The technology's success encouraged AOL to acquire Mirabilis on June 8, 1998, for $287 million up front and $120 million in additional payments over three years based on performance levels. In 2002 AOL successfully patented the technology.

After the purchase the product was initially managed by Ariel Yarnitsky and Avi Shechter. ICQ's management changed at the end of 2003. Under the leadership of the new CEO, Orey Gilliam, who also assumed the responsibility for all of AOL's messaging business in 2007, ICQ resumed its growth; it was not only a highly profitable company, but one of AOL's most successful businesses. Eliav Moshe replaced Gilliam in 2009 and became ICQ's managing director.

In April 2010, AOL sold ICQ to Digital Sky Technologies, headed by Alisher Usmanov, for $187.5 million. While ICQ was displaced by AOL Instant Messenger, Google Talk, and other competitors in the U.S. and many other countries over the 2000s, it remained the most popular instant messaging network in Russian-speaking countries, and an important part of online culture. Popular UINs demanded over 11,000₽ in 2010.

In September of that year, Digital Sky Technologies changed its name to Mail.Ru Group. Since the acquisition, Mail.ru has invested in turning ICQ from a desktop client to a mobile messaging system. As of 2013, around half of ICQ's users were using its mobile apps, and in 2014, the number of users began growing for the first time since the purchase.

In March 2016, the source code of the client was released under the Apache license on github.com.

Development history
ICQ 99a/b the first releases that were widely available.
ICQ 2000 incorporated into Notes and Reminder features.
ICQ 2001 included server-side storage of the contact list. This provided synchronization between multiple computers and enforced obtaining consent before adding UINs to the contact list by preventing clients from modifying the local contact list directly.
On December 19, 2002, AOL Time Warner announced that ICQ had been issued a United States patent for instant messaging.
ICQ 2002 was the last completely advertising-free ICQ version.
ICQ Pro 2003b was the first ICQ version to use the ICQ protocol version 10. However, ICQ 5 and 5.1 use version 9 of the protocol. ICQ 2002 and 2003a used version 8 of the ICQ protocol. Earlier versions (ICQ 2001b and all ICQ clients before it) used ICQ protocol version 7.
ICQ 4 and later ICQ 5 (released on Monday, February 7, 2005), were upgrades on ICQ Lite. One addition was Xtraz, which offers games and features intended to appeal to younger users of the Internet. ICQ Lite was originally an idea to offer the lighter users of instant messaging an alternative client which was a smaller download and less resource-hungry for relatively slow computers.
ICQ 5 introduced skins support. There are few official skins available for the current ICQ 5.1 at the official website; however, a number of user-generated skins have been made available for download.
ICQ 6, released on April 17, 2007, was the first major update since ICQ 4. The user interface has been redesigned using Boxely, the same rendering engine used in AIM Triton. This change adds new features such as the ability to send IMs directly from the client's contact list. ICQ has recently started forcing users of v5.1 to upgrade to version 6 (and XP).  Those who do not upgrade will find their older version of ICQ does not start up.  Although the upgrade to version 6 should be seen as a positive thing, some users may find that useful features such as sending multiple files at one time is no longer supported in the new version.  At the beginning of July 2008, a network upgrade forced users to stop using ICQ 5.1 - applications that identified themselves as ICQ 5, such as Pidgin, were forced to identify themselves as ICQ 6. There seems to be no alternative for users other than using a different IM program or patching ICQ 5.1 with a special application.
ICQ 7.0, released on January 18, 2010. This update includes integration with Facebook and other websites. It also allows custom personal status similar to Windows Live Messenger (MSN Messenger). ICQ 7.0 does not support traditional Chinese on standard installation or with the addition of an official language pack. This has made its adoption difficult with the established user base from Hong Kong and Taiwan where traditional Chinese is the official language.
ICQ 8, released on February 5, 2012 - "Meet the new generation of ICQ, Enjoy free video calls, messages and SMS, social networks support and more."
ICQ 10.0, released January 18, 2016. Newest update is 10.0 Build 46867, released on May 27, 2022.

Criticism

Policy against unofficial clients
AOL pursued an aggressive policy regarding alternative ("unauthorized") ICQ clients.
In July 2008, changes were implemented on ICQ servers causing many unofficial clients to stop working. These users received an official notification from "ICQ System".
On December 9, 2008, another change to the ICQ servers occurred: clients sending Client IDs not matching ICQ 5.1 or higher stopped working.
On December 29, 2008, the ICQ press service distributed a statement characterizing alternative clients as dangerous.
On January 21, 2009, ICQ servers started blocking all unofficial clients in Russia and Commonwealth of Independent States countries. Users in Russia and Ukraine received a message from UIN 1:
"Системное сообщение
ICQ не поддерживает используемую вами версию. Скачайте бесплатную авторизованную версию ICQ с официального web-сайта ICQ.
System Message
The version you are using is not supported by ICQ. Download a free authorized ICQ version from ICQ's official website."
On icq.com there was an "important message" for Russian-speaking ICQ users: "ICQ осуществляет поддержку только авторизированных версий программ: ICQ Lite и ICQ 6.5." ("ICQ supports only authorized versions of programs: ICQ Lite and ICQ 6.5.")
On February 3, 2009, the events of January 21 were repeated.
On December 27, 2018, ICQ announced it was to stop supporting unofficial clients, affecting many users who prefer a compact size using Miranda NG and other clients.
On December 28, 2018, ICQ stopped working on some unofficial clients.
In late March, 2019, ICQ stopped working on the Pidgin client, as initiated in December 2018.

Cooperation with Russian intelligence services
According to a Novaya Gazeta article published in May 2018, Russian intelligence agencies had access to online reading of ICQ users' correspondence during crime investigations. The article examined 34 sentences of Russian courts, during the investigation of which the evidence of the defendants' guilt was obtained by reading correspondence on a PC or mobile devices. Of the fourteen cases in which ICQ was involved, in six cases the capturing of information occurred before the seizure of the device. Because the rival service Telegram blocks all access for the agencies, the Advisor of the Russian President, Herman Klimenko, recommended to use ICQ instead.

Clients
AOL's OSCAR network protocol used by ICQ is proprietary and using a third party client is a violation of ICQ Terms of Service. Nevertheless, a number of third-party clients have been created by using reverse-engineering and protocol descriptions. These clients include:

 Adium: supports ICQ, Yahoo!, AIM, MSN, Google Talk, XMPP, and others, for macOS
 Ayttm: supports ICQ, Yahoo!, AIM, MSN, IRC, and XMPP
 bitlbee: IRC gateway, supports ICQ, Yahoo!, AIM, MSN, Google Talk, and XMPP
 centericq: supports ICQ, Yahoo!, AIM, MSN, IRC and XMPP, text-based
 climm (formerly mICQ): text-based
 Fire: supports ICQ, Yahoo!, AIM, MSN, IRC, and XMPP, for macOS
 Jimm: supports ICQ, for Java ME mobile devices
 Kopete: supports AIM, ICQ, MSN, Yahoo, XMPP, Google Talk, IRC, Gadu-Gadu, Novell GroupWise Messenger and others, for Unix-like
 Meetro: IM and social networking combined with location; supports AIM, ICQ, MSN, Yahoo!
 Miranda NG: supports ICQ, Yahoo!, AIM, MSN, IRC, Google Talk, XMPP, Gadu-Gadu, BNet and others, for Windows
 Naim: ncurses-based
 Pidgin (formerly Gaim): supports ICQ, Yahoo!, AIM, Gtalk, MSN, IRC, XMPP, Gadu-Gadu, SILC, Meanwhile, (IBM Lotus Sametime) and others
 QIP: supports ICQ, AIM, XMPP and XIMSS
 stICQ: supports ICQ, for Symbian OS
 Trillian: supports ICQ, IRC, Google Talk, XMPP and others

AOL supported clients include:
 AOL Instant Messenger (discontinued in 2017)
 Messages/iChat: uses ICQ's UIN as an AIM screenname, for macOS

See also
Comparison of instant messaging clients
Comparison of instant messaging protocols
LAN messenger
Online chat
Windows Live Messenger
Tencent QQ

References

External links

 Official ICQ Website

Instant messaging clients
1996 software
AIM (software) clients
AOL
BlackBerry software
IOS software
Symbian software
2010 mergers and acquisitions
Mergers and acquisitions of Israeli companies
Android (operating system) software
Formerly proprietary software
1996 establishments in Israel